All Star Baseball 2003 is a baseball video game published by Acclaim Entertainment in 2002. The game features Derek Jeter on the cover.

There are several different modes of play, such as exhibition, managing an existing Major League Baseball team, creating a team or creating a player. Many United States cities are available for "expansion", in addition to Mexico City and Puerto Rico.

Reception

The game received "generally favorable reviews" on all platforms according to the review aggregation website Metacritic. In Japan, where the GameCube and Xbox versions were ported for release on August 8, 2002, followed by the PS2 version on November 14, 2002, Famitsu gave it a score of 25 out of 40 for the GameCube version, and 26 out of 40 for the Xbox version.

By the end of 2002, the game sold over 563,000 copies in North America, becoming the best-selling baseball game of the year in the region. The game sold over 600,000 copies worldwide, becoming the best-selling title in the series.

References

External links
 
 

2002 video games
Acclaim Entertainment games
All-Star Baseball video games
Baseball video games
Game Boy Advance games
GameCube games
PlayStation 2 games
Video games developed in the United States
Video games set in 2003
Xbox games